The following is a sortable table of all songs by Saves the Day:

The column Song list the song title.
The column Writer(s) lists who wrote the song.
The column Album lists the album the song is featured on.
The column Producer lists the producer of the song.
The column Year lists the year in which the song was released.
The column Length list the length/duration of the song.

Studio recordings

See also
 Saves the Day discography

References
 Footnotes
Available for download when purchasing a copy of In Reverie (2003) on CD.
Later included on the rarities collection Ups & Downs: Early Recordings and B-Sides (2004).
Bonus tracks on the Japanese edition of Daybreak (2011).

 Citations

Saves the Day